Allar (also known as Chatan) is an unclassified  Dravidian language spoken in Kerala (Malappuram district-Perinthalmanna tahsil, Manjeri tahsil, Mannarmala, Aminikadu, and Tazhecode; Palakkad district-Mannarkkad and Ottappalam tahsils), India.  Due to a lack of scholarly study, Allar cannot be classified within Dravidian at this time and may be a dialect of some other Dravidian language.

References

Dravidian languages
Languages of Kerala
Unclassified languages of Asia